St George's Church, Colegate, Norwich is a Grade I listed parish church in the Church of England in Norwich.

History

The church is medieval. The nave and tower date from 1459 and the chancel from 1498. The aisles and chapels are 1505 and 1513.

Organ

The church contains an organ which dated from 1802 by George Pike England. A specification of the organ can be found on the National Pipe Organ Register. As a mark of its historic value, the organ has been awarded an Historic Organ Certificate by the British Institute of Organ Studies.

References

Saint George
15th-century church buildings in England
Grade I listed churches in Norfolk